Jean Pierre François Camille Montagne (15 February 1784 – 5 December 1866) was a French military physician and botanist who specialized in the fields of bryology and mycology. He was born in the commune of Vaudoy in the department of Seine-et-Marne.

At the age of 14, Montagne joined the French navy, and took part in Napoleon's invasion of Egypt. In 1802 he returned to France to study medicine, and two years later became a military surgeon. In 1832, at the age of 48 he retired from military service to concentrate on the study of cryptogams (mosses, algae, lichens and fungi). In 1853 he was elected a member of the Académie des sciences.

In 1845 he was one of the first scientists (with Marie-Anne Libert) to provide a description of Phytophthora infestans, a potato blight fungus he referred to as Botrytis infestans. Montagne is also known for investigations of mycological species native to Guyane.

He contributed numerous articles to the Archives de Botanique and the Annales des Sciences naturelles. 

The fungal genera Montagnaea (DC., 1835) and Montagnites (Fr.) commemorate his name. 
Also genera Montagnula , Montagnina , Montagnellina  and Camontagnea  were named in his honour.

He died in Paris on 5 December 1866.

See also
 :Category:Taxa named by Camille Montagne

References 
 Laboratoire de Botanique et de Mycologie (biography in French)

Botanists active in South America
19th-century French botanists
French mycologists
Members of the French Academy of Sciences
Corresponding members of the Saint Petersburg Academy of Sciences
People from Seine-et-Marne
Bryologists
1784 births
1866 deaths